Becky Shaw is a play written by Gina Gionfriddo. The play premiered at the Humana Festival in 2008 and opened Off-Broadway in 2008. The play was a finalist for the 2009 Pulitzer Prize for Drama.

Productions
The play had its world premiere at the Humana Festival of New American Plays in Louisville, Kentucky on February 29, 2008. The play was commissioned by the Actors Theatre of Louisville after the success of Gionfriddo's last play, After Ashley, at the 2004 Humana Festival. Directed by Peter Dubois, the cast featured Annie Parisse. Charles Isherwood reviewed the play for The New York Times, writing: "The new play marks an impressive stride for a writer with a saw-toothed wit and a seductive interest in exploring the rewards and responsibilities of emotional interdependence...Becky Shaw is a thoroughly enjoyable play, suspenseful, witty and infused with an unsettling sense of the potential for psychic disaster inherent in almost any close relationship."

After the play opened to critical acclaim at the Humana Festival, it was soon announced that Second Stage Theatre would play host to its Off-Broadway debut in the winter of 2008–09.  Performances began at Second Stage on December 16, 2008, in previews, officially opening on January 8, 2009. This production saw the return of director Peter DuBois along with original cast members Annie Parisse (as Becky Shaw) and David Wilson Barnes. The cast featured Emily Bergl, Kelly Bishop, and Thomas Sadoski. Kelly Bishop was cast as Susan, a woman with MS who hooks up with a man much younger than herself, and quite disreputable. Susan, a domineering woman, also has quite a dysfunctional relationship with her daughter Suzanna (Emily Bergl) in the play. Due to positive reception and strong box office numbers, performances were extended through March 15, 2009.

Director Peter DuBois and Gionfriddo met at Brown University in the 1990s, and DuBois directed her thesis production (U.S. Drag) there; he has also directed her play Rapture, Blister, Burn.

Regional and international
The Wilma Theatre in Philadelphia, Pennsylvania produced the play from December 30, 2009, to February 7, 2010, directed by Anne Kauffman.

The Australian premiere was produced by Echelon Productions at the MTC Lawler Studio in Melbourne opening on October 27, 2010. The production was directed by Indira Carmichael and starred Daniel Frederiksen, Amanda Levy, Alex Papps, Kate Atkinson and Judith Roberts.

The San Francisco Playhouse produced the play from January 24 to March 10, 2012.  It was directed by Amy Glazer.

Awards and nominations
In discussing the possibilities for the 2009 Pulitzer Prize for Drama, Playbill wrote: "Another contender frequently mentioned for the 2009 Pulitzer is Gina Gionfriddo's Becky Shaw... as praised as that work [After Ashley] was, many critics considered Becky Shaw — about a quartet of emotionally damaged and dependent young people — to be her most mature play to date." Becky Shaw was a finalist for the 2009 Pulitzer Prize for Drama (won by Ruined).

Gina Gionfriddo won the 2009 Outer Critics Circle Award (John Gassner Award). The play received nominations for the Lucille Lortel Award, Outer Critics Circle Award, and Drama Desk Award as Outstanding Play.

References

External links
 
 

2008 plays
American plays
Off-Broadway plays